Alstroemeria kingii is a species of flowering plant in the family Alstroemeriaceae, native to north Chile.

References

kingii
Flora of northern Chile
Plants described in 1873